Erin Anthony Barnett (born 2 September 1996) is a Gibraltarian footballer who plays for St Joseph's and the Gibraltar national team. He is mainly a centre back player.

Club career
Barnett emerged from the Lions Gibraltar youth set up in 2013, at the age of 16, and quickly became a regular fixture in the side. He was released by the club in 2015, however. After a year without a club, he re-signed in summer 2016. Before the transfer window closed, he moved again as he was signed by Gibraltar United. After Gibraltar United were expelled from the league in August 2019, he joined Boca Gibraltar, making his debut on 13 August against Manchester 62. However, he only played one game for the club before moving to the UK to study. After receiving international clearance, he signed for Marine on 11 January 2020.

International career

Having previously played at under-19 level and representing a development squad at the 2015 Island Games, Barnett was first called up to the Gibraltar senior team in 2014, as an unused substitute against Malta. He made his debut at the age of 17 in September 2015 in the matches against Republic of Ireland and Poland. He made his international début with Gibraltar on 4 September 2015 in game with Republic of Ireland.

International statistics

.

References

External links

1996 births
Living people
Gibraltarian footballers
Gibraltar international footballers
Association football defenders
Gibraltar United F.C. players
Lions Gibraltar F.C. players
Gibraltar Premier Division players
Gibraltar under-21 international footballers
Gibraltar youth international footballers
Marine F.C. players